Fan Xinyi (born 26 January 2002) is a Chinese trampoline gymnast. She won the gold medal in the girls' trampoline event at the 2018 Summer Youth Olympics held in Buenos Aires, Argentina. She also won the gold medal in the mixed multi-discipline team event.

At the 2018 Asian Trampoline Gymnastics Championships held in Makati, Philippines, she won the gold medal in the women's junior event.

In 2019, she won the bronze medal in the mixed all-around team event at the Trampoline Gymnastics World Championships held in Tokyo, Japan.

References

External links 
 

Living people
2002 births
Place of birth missing (living people)
Chinese female trampolinists
Gymnasts at the 2018 Summer Youth Olympics
Medalists at the Trampoline Gymnastics World Championships
Youth Olympic gold medalists for China
21st-century Chinese women